Zou is the 67th most common Chinese surname, which originated from the state of Zou of the Spring and Autumn period in ancient China. Depending on Chinese variety, Zou can be transliterated as Chow, Chau, Tsau, Trau, Tsou or Chew. It is the 35th name on the Hundred Family Surnames poem.

Notable people
Zou Yan (鄒衍), Chinese philosopher best known as the representative thinker of the Yin and Yang School (or School of Naturalists) during the Hundred Schools of Thought era
Zou Rong, anti-Qing revolutionary
Zou Zhe: 鄒喆; pinyin: Zōu Zhé; Wade–Giles: Tsou Che 1636-ca. 1708), Chinese painter during the Qing Dynasty
Zou Taofen, journalist
Zou Jiahua, Vice Premier of China, son of Zou Taofen
Chen-Lu Tsou, Chinese biochemist
Zou Yinglong (deputy prime minister, Song Dynasty)
Zou Yuanbiao (judge, Ming Dynasty)
Zou Yiguai (judge, Qing Dynasty)
Olivia Chow (鄒至蕙; born 1957), Canadian politician, federal New Democratic Party (NDP) member of Parliament
Collin Chou, Taiwanese-born Hong Kong-based actor
Shuping Wang, original surname Zou, Chinese-American medical researcher and public health whistleblower
Zou Taixin (邹太新; born 1966) Chinese former politician
Zou Yuchen (邹雨宸; born 1996) Chinese male professional basketball player
Zou Yu (邹瑜; born 1920), a politician of the People's Republic
Zou Yucheng (邹宇成; pinyin: Zōu Yǔchéng; born 1991), Chinese footballer
Zou Yigui (邹一桂, 1686–1772), style name as Yuanbao (原褒), sobriquet
 Zou Lunlun (simplified Chinese: 邹伦伦; traditional Chinese: 鄒倫倫; pinyin: Zōu Lúnlún), player and teacher of the guzheng, a Chinese zither
Zou Dehai (Chinese: 邹德海; pinyin: Zōu Déhǎi; born 1993), a Chinese footballer who plays for Beijing Guoan in the Chinese Super
Zou Zhenxian (邹振先; born 1955), Chinese triple jumper

References 

Chinese-language surnames
Individual Chinese surnames